Dibenzepin, sold under the brand name Noveril among others, is a tricyclic antidepressant (TCA) used widely throughout Europe for the treatment of depression. It has similar efficacy and effects relative to other TCAs like imipramine but with fewer side effects.

Medical uses
Dibenzepin is used mainly in the treatment of major depressive disorder.

Like other TCAs, dibenzepin may have potential use in the treatment of chronic neuropathic pain.

Overdose

As TCAs have a relatively narrow therapeutic index, the likelihood of overdose (both accidental and intentional) is fairly high and should be considered carefully by the prescribing physician prior to patient use. Symptoms of overdose are similar to those of other TCAs, with cardiac toxicity (due to inhibition of sodium and calcium channels) generally occurring before the threshold for serotonin syndrome is reached. Due to this risk, TCAs are rarely selected as the first-line treatment for depression.

Pharmacology

Pharmacodynamics

Dibenzepin acts as a selective norepinephrine reuptake inhibitor (NRI), with similar potency to that of imipramine. It is also a potent antihistamine. The drug has weak or negligible effects on serotonin and dopamine reuptake. Unlike many other TCAs, dibenzepin has no antiadrenergic (α1, α2), antiserotonergic (5-HT1A, 5-HT2A), or antidopaminergic effects and has few or no anticholinergic effects.

Pharmacokinetics
Therapeutic levels of dibenzepin are approximately 85 to 850 nM. Its plasma protein binding is approximately 80%.

History
Dibenzepin was first introduced, in Switzerland and West Germany, in 1965. It was introduced in France in 1967, in Italy in 1968, in the United Kingdom in 1970, and in Japan in 1975. It was also marketed in a number of other countries, including Portugal and Israel.

Society and culture

Brand names
Dibenzepin is or was marketed mainly under the brand name Noveril. It has also been marketed under a number of other brand names, including Ansiopax, Deprex, Ecatril, Neodit, and Victoril.

References

External links
 

Dimethylamino compounds
Dibenzodiazepines
H1 receptor antagonists
Lactams
Norepinephrine reuptake inhibitors
Tricyclic antidepressants